The 2003–04 All-Ireland Intermediate Club Football Championship was the inaugural staging of the All-Ireland Intermediate Club Football Championship since its establishment by the Gaelic Athletic Association.

The All-Ireland final was played on 25 April 2004 at Páirc Mhearnóg in Portmarnock, between Ilen Rovers and St. Michael's. Ilen Rovers won the match by 1-11 to 1-04 to claim their first ever championship title.

All-Ireland Intermediate Club Football Championship

All-Ireland final

References

2003 in Irish sport
2004 in Irish sport
All-Ireland Intermediate Club Football Championship
All-Ireland Intermediate Club Football Championship